The 2001 WGC-Accenture Match Play Championship was a golf tournament that was played from 3–7 January 2001 at Metropolitan Golf Club in Melbourne, Victoria, Australia. It was the third WGC-Accenture Match Play Championship and the first of three World Golf Championships events held in 2001.

Steve Stricker won his first and only World Golf Championships event at the match-play, by defeating Pierre Fulke  2&1 in the 36 hole final.

Brackets
The Championship was a single elimination match play event. The field consisted of the top 64 players available from the Official World Golf Rankings, seeded according to the rankings. Because it was played in Australia and also because it was very early in the year a large number of players chose not compete. These were: Tiger Woods (ranked 1), David Duval (3), Phil Mickelson (4), Lee Westwood (5), Colin Montgomerie (6), Davis Love III (7), Jesper Parnevik (11), Darren Clarke (12), Nick Price (13), Jim Furyk (15), Sergio García (16), Thomas Bjørn (20), Mike Weir (21), Loren Roberts (22), Carlos Franco (25), Miguel Ángel Jiménez (27), Paul Azinger (30), Rocco Mediate (32), Notah Begay III (33), José María Olazábal (34), Jeff Maggert (37), Fred Couples (39), Eduardo Romero (40), Greg Norman (42), Scott Hoch (46), Ángel Cabrera (47), Mark Calcavecchia (48), Shingo Katayama (53), Masashi Ozaki (67), Andrew Magee (73), Mark O'Meara (74), Lee Janzen (82), Ian Woosnam (83), Rory Sabbatini (85), Frank Lickliter (87), Stephen Ames (94), J. P. Hayes (95), Jarmo Sandelin (96), Bill Glasson (97) and Steve Elkington (101). The lowest player competing was Greg Kraft (104).

Bobby Jones bracket

Ben Hogan bracket

Gary Player bracket

Sam Snead bracket

Final Four

Breakdown by country

Prize money breakdown

References

External links
 Bracket PDF source
 About the matches

WGC Match Play
Golf tournaments in Australia
Sports competitions in Melbourne
WGC-Accenture Match Play Championship
WGC-Accenture Match Play Championship
WGC-Accenture Match Play Championship